Felipe Cadenazzi (born 12 October 1991) is an Argentine professional footballer who plays as a forward.

Career
Cadenazzi featured in Atlético de Rafaela's academy, prior to starting his senior career with Central Córdoba in 2011; making one Torneo Argentino A appearance. Cadenazzi made a move to regional football by joining Corinthians Santa Fe in 2012; a team co-founded by their Brazilian namesakes. Cadenazzi made the move to Brazilian football itself in 2014, joining Campeonato Paulista Série A3 side Flamengo. He made appearances for the club against Santacruzense and Rio Preto. In January 2015, after a stint back with Corinthians Santa Fe, Cadenazzi signed for Atlético Paraná. Thirteen in sixty-nine games followed.

Quilmes became Cadenazzi's fifth different senior club on 31 July 2017. He made his debut against Sarmiento on 18 September, before scoring his first goal for them on 23 September versus Villa Dálmine. He ended the 2017–18 campaign with five goals in fifteen fixtures as Quilmes finished twelfth. Cadenazzi joined Mitre of Primera B Nacional in July 2018. A year later, Cadenazzi moved across the division to Brown. He scored three goals in thirty total matches across those two stints. In July 2020, Cadenazzi headed to Alvarado.

In 2022, Cadenazzi joined Seoul E-Land FC of South Korean K League 2. He scored his first goal for the club at an away match against Gyeongnam FC held in February 20. He scored his second goal via penalty at a match against Gimpo FC held on 17th May, which was also the first goal for the club at Mokdong Stadium.

Career statistics
.

References

External links

1991 births
Living people
People from La Capital Department, Santa Fe
Argentine footballers
Association football forwards
Argentine expatriate footballers
Expatriate footballers in Brazil
Expatriate footballers in South Korea
Argentine expatriate sportspeople in Brazil
Argentine expatriate sportspeople in South Korea
Torneo Argentino A players
Primera Nacional players
K League 2 players
Central Córdoba de Santiago del Estero footballers
Associação Atlética Flamengo players
Club Atlético Paraná players
Quilmes Atlético Club footballers
Club Atlético Mitre footballers
Club Atlético Brown footballers
Club Atlético Alvarado players
Seoul E-Land FC players
Sportspeople from Santa Fe Province